This article is about the particular significance of the year 1735 to Wales and its people.

Incumbents

Lord Lieutenant of North Wales (Lord Lieutenant of Anglesey, Caernarvonshire, Flintshire, Merionethshire, Montgomeryshire) – George Cholmondeley, 3rd Earl of Cholmondeley 
Lord Lieutenant of Glamorgan – Charles Powlett, 3rd Duke of Bolton
Lord Lieutenant of Brecknockshire and Lord Lieutenant of Monmouthshire – Thomas Morgan
Lord Lieutenant of Cardiganshire – John Vaughan, 2nd Viscount Lisburne
Lord Lieutenant of Carmarthenshire – vacant until 1755
Lord Lieutenant of Denbighshire – Sir Robert Salusbury Cotton, 3rd Baronet 
Lord Lieutenant of Pembrokeshire – Sir Arthur Owen, 3rd Baronet
Lord Lieutenant of Radnorshire – James Brydges, 1st Duke of Chandos

Bishop of Bangor – Charles Cecil (from 15 January)
Bishop of Llandaff – John Harris 
Bishop of St Asaph – Thomas Tanner (until 14 December)
Bishop of St Davids – Nicholas Clagett

Events
29 January - The Kemeys baronetcy of Cefn Mabli becomes extinct on the death of Sir Charles Kemeys, 4th Baronet. His property at Cefn Mably is inherited by Sir Charles Tynte, 5th Baronet.
20 April - Religious conversion of Howell Harris at Talgarth, marking a beginning of the Welsh Methodist revival.
September - Griffith Hughes records in his diary that he has broken his "knee pan" while travelling in Pennsylvania on behalf of the Society for the Propagation of the Gospel.
date unknown - Swansea-born Beau Nash appoints himself Master of Ceremonies at Tunbridge Wells, where a public house is later named after him.

Arts and literature

New books
Lewis Morris - Tlysau yr Hen Oesoedd

Births
1 March - John Price, librarian (died 1813)
24 June - Barbara Herbert, Countess of Powis, posthumous daughter of Lord Edward Herbert (died 1786)  
July - Cecil de Cardonnel, 2nd Baroness Dynevor, peeress (died 1793)

Deaths
5 April - Sir Edward Stradling, 5th Baronet, MP for Cardiff and Sheriff of Glamorgan, 62
July - John Ellis, antiquarian, 61
14 December - Thomas Tanner, Bishop of St Asaph, 61

References

1735 by country
1735 in Great Britain